Emmanuel Toku (born 10 July 2000) is a Ghanaian professional footballer who plays as an attacking midfielder for OH Leuven. He played for Ghana at the youth level, playing for them in the 2017 FIFA U-17 World Cup and serving as the captain of the Ghana U-20 national team in 2019.

Club career

Fremad Amager

2019–20 season
Toku started his career with Ghanaian side Cheetah F.C. In August 2019, he signed for Danish 1st Division side Fremad Amager. He made his debut on 25 October 2019 in a 2–1 loss against Hvidovre IF, coming on as a substitute for Théo Chendri at half time. He made his first start for the club on 2 November 2020 in a 4–0 loss to Vejle Boldklub. Toku In a match against  HB Køge, he came on in the 60th minute to assist a goal for Lukas Engel in the 83rd minute, which helped the team salvage a 1–1 draw at the end of the match. After that performance he featured more, going on to start in 8th successive times, in the process scoring his first goal in a 4–2 home win against Fredericia HK on 29 February 2020. He scored his second league in a heavy 4–0 home win against Nykøbing FC on 1 July 2020.

On 25 July 2020, he scored a goal against the eventual league champions Vejle Boldklub during the last match of the season which ended in a 4–1 home win for his team. At the end of his first season with the club, he played 18 league matches and scored 3 goals.

2020–21 season
Toku signed a new contract with the Danish team in August 2020, which extended his stay to 2023. He was key member of the club in his second season. He started in the first match of the season on 13 September 2020 against Vendsyssel FF, in the process scoring a screamer for his first goal of the season in the 40th minute of the match which ended in 6–0 win. He also scored the 3rd goal in the 73rd minute in a 4–0 match against  Hvidovre IF on 20 September 2020.  Toku scored a brace on 26 September 2020 in 2–0 win over Skive JK and scored another brace in two minutes in a match against Hobro IK which ended in a 4–0 win.

The club confirmed that other teams had showed interest in signing him during the winter transfer season. He played in 16 matches in the first round of the league and scored 6 goals before he moved on loan to Botev Plovdiv.

Botev Plovdiv
After playing the first round of the season with Fremad Amager, Toku signed an 18-month loan with Bulgarian Parva liga side Botev Plovdiv on 11 February 2021. He made his debut for the club in a 2–0 loss against FC Arda Kardzhali on 12 February 2021 and enjoyed 74 minutes of action before being substituted as he was named in the team's starting line-up for the game. In September 2021, he joined the club on a permanent deal, signing a three-year contract with the Plovdiv-based club. He was assigned the number 10 jersey.

Leuven
In January 2023, Toku joined Belgian Pro League club OH Leuven.

International career
Toku played in the 2017 FIFA U-17 World Cup and later captained the national under-20 team at the 2019 African Games.

Honours
Ghana U17
 Africa U-17 Cup of Nations runner-up: 2017

References

External links
 

Living people
2000 births
Ghanaian footballers
Association football midfielders
Ghana youth international footballers
Ghana under-20 international footballers
Competitors at the 2019 African Games
African Games competitors for Ghana
Danish 1st Division players
First Professional Football League (Bulgaria) players
Belgian Pro League players
Cheetah F.C. players
Fremad Amager players
Botev Plovdiv players
Oud-Heverlee Leuven players
Ghanaian expatriate footballers
Ghanaian expatriate sportspeople in Denmark
Expatriate men's footballers in Denmark
Ghanaian expatriate sportspeople in Bulgaria
Expatriate footballers in Bulgaria
Expatriate footballers in Belgium
Ghanaian expatriate sportspeople in Belgium